J. William Cooper (born June 3, 1933) is an American former politician and judge. He served in the Georgia House of Representatives as a Democrat.

References

Living people
1933 births
Democratic Party members of the Georgia House of Representatives
People from Wilkes County, Georgia
Georgia (U.S. state) lawyers